Candelaria Loxicha  is a town and municipality in Oaxaca in south-western Mexico. The municipality covers an area of 86.8 km².
It is part of the Pochutla District in the east of the Costa Region. 

As of 2005, the municipality had a total population of 8,686.

References

Municipalities of Oaxaca